Jacquie Perrin (born c. 1949) is a Canadian journalist. She was host of the CBC's Saturday Report and is current host of the Sunday 5:00 p.m. edition of CBC News: Today on CBC Newsworld. Her broadcast career began at CKWS radio in Kingston, Ontario where she hosted a daily TV talk show. She also put her geography degree from York University to good use as the local weather reporter. Jacquie was selected Miss Dominion of Canada in 1969 and represented Canada at the Miss Universe, Miss World, Miss International, and Queen of the Pacific pageants. She is also an accomplished pilot.

External links
Jacquie Perrin profile at CBC.ca archived from the original on November 9, 2012

1940s births
Canadian aviators
Canadian beauty pageant winners
Canadian women aviators
Canadian radio personalities
Canadian television meteorologists
Canadian television news anchors
Canadian women television journalists
CBC Television people
Journalists from Toronto
Living people
Miss International 1970 delegates
Miss Universe 1969 contestants
Miss World 1969 delegates
York University alumni
20th-century Canadian journalists
21st-century Canadian journalists
20th-century Canadian women